Parasa shirakii is a moth of the family Limacodidae. It is found in Taiwan.

The wingspan is 27–34 mm.

References

Moths described in 1930
Limacodidae
Moths of Taiwan